Charles Twysden Hoare (10 November 1851 – 22 January 1935) was an English first-class cricketer active 1871–78 who played for Middlesex and Surrey. He was born in Mitcham; died in Bicester.

References

1851 births
1935 deaths
English cricketers
Middlesex cricketers
Surrey cricketers
Marylebone Cricket Club cricketers
North v South cricketers
Non-international England cricketers
Gentlemen of England cricketers
Hoare family